Jorge Nuno de Lima Pinto da Costa (born 28 December 1937) is the president of Portuguese sports club FC Porto since 1982. He is the president with most titles won (67) and most days in charge in world football. He was involved in the Portuguese football corruption scandal Apito Dourado, from which he was eventually absolved in April 2009 after receiving a two-year suspension and a €10,000 fine in May 2008.

Early years
Pinto da Costa was born in Porto, the son of José Alexandrino Teixeira da Costa and Maria Elisa Bessa Lima de Amorim Pinto, who fathered other four children, including future forensic pathologist José Eduardo.

In his late teens, Pinto da Costa started working as a bank teller. He began collaborating with FC Porto, while keeping his day job; in 1953, on his 16th birthday, his maternal grandmother registered him as a club associate and he was a frequent attender of the team's football and roller hockey games, eventually going on to work in directorial capacities in the latter department, in his early 20s.

Directorial beginnings
Jorge Nuno Pinto da Costa's career at FC Porto started when he was just 20 years old, after accepting the club's invitation to join the rink hockey administrative commission. In 1962 he became chief of the rink hockey department, a job he would eventually accumulate after also taking over as chief of the boxing department in 1967. In 1969, he integrated Afonso Pinto de Magalhães's Chairman candidacy list as Head of all Amateur Departments. Their list won the elections and he held the job for the three following years. Despite being invited by future president Américo de Sá to join his then candidacy list, he refused the offer as he felt the candidate should bring forward a renewed list. He left the club in 1971 after Pinto de Magalhães's mandate was over.

Return
In 1976, FC Porto's most popular department, association football, was facing the longest title drought in the club's history, having not won the Primeira Liga for 19 years. This period coincided with the rise of neighbors Boavista F.C., who under the guidance of Pinto da Costa's friend and Porto's former player and coach, José Maria Pedroto, would win later that season the Taça de Portugal.

On the same night FC Porto's transfer target Brazilian player Amarildo, fled to city rivals Boavista F.C. at the last-minute, Pinto da Costa was provoked by friends, some of whom were directors of Boavista F.C., with allegations that Boavista had surpassed Porto as the city's major sporting force. He considered this an outrage and vowed on that night to return to his beloved club. Soon after he contacted then FC Porto's Chairman Américo de Sá and both arranged his return through the formers reelection list, this time as director of football. Before the elections, he agreed terms with José Maria Pedroto, who was still coaching Boavista F.C. at the time. In May 1976 Chairman Américo de Sá was reelected and Pinto da Costa returned to the club as director of football, alongside Pedroto as a coach.

Rise and first victories
It was under Pinto da Costa's and José Maria Pedroto's guidance that, in 1976–77, Porto won the Taça de Portugal, their first silverware in 18 years. During the following season their success continued when they finally broke their 19-year-old title drought and won the 1977–78 league. The 1978–79 season would mark a back-to-back league title for both men. Subsequently, though, in 1980 after failing a third title in a row, internal disputes regarding other sporting departments having too much influence in FC Porto football section led to their resignation. Following their resignation 15 first team players refused to play for the club. This specific period of time is dubbed as "Verão Quente" (Hot summer).

Pinto da Costa and Pedroto, Chairman and Manager
On 17 April 1982, following internal disputes in FC Porto, Pinto da Costa became the 33rd Chairman of the club and chose Pedroto as the association football manager. This partnership was to have a lasting effect on FC Porto's whole structure. Pedroto was a visionary, a highly talented football player whose charisma as coach was unique. Under Pedroto, in 1984, FC Porto reached its first European final. FC Porto lost 2–1 to Juventus in Basel, in the Cup Winners' Cup final. By then Pedroto was already ill, having been diagnosed with cancer. He would resign his duties and died shortly afterwards, in 1985.

European Champions
Artur Jorge was appointed as Pedroto's replacement, and European recognition would finally come under his spell. In 1987, Porto faced Bayern Munich for the European Cup final. At halftime, Bayern took a 1–0 lead. But the rookie Portuguese side would come back to claim a historic victory. Algerian Rabah Madjer scored with his heel to draw the match, and Juary later sealed the 2–1 win that ensured FC Porto the biggest feat of its near centenary history.

Years of domestic success - association football
Domestic success continued to be a hallmark of FC Porto in subsequent years, and 1995–99 became the highest note of Portuguese domestic competition ever. Following titles by Bobby Robson (1995 and 1996) and António Oliveira (1997 and 1998), Fernando Santos captured a record-setting fifth consecutive title in 1999.
Porto later achieved second place in the championship but won the 2000 and 2001 Portuguese Cups (whilst reaching the European Quarterfinals in both seasons) only to replace Fernando Santos with Octávio Machado. Octávio however only had a short stint at Porto. His replacement would be José Mourinho.

1999 Sweep
In the end of the 1998–99 season FCPorto swept the Portuguese professional sports by winning all the competitions in which it had a professional team: football, handball, basketball and rink hockey. It also won the swimming national championship which made a total of 5 championship titles in the same year. In Portugal it was called the "double penta", making reference to the 5 consecutive championships in football.

José Mourinho era
Mourinho joined Porto in January 2002, the club was in fifth place on the table. Mourinho would ensure a UEFA Cup berth for the following season, ending the league in third. Summer of 2002 saw a lot of movement on the transfer market by Porto. The bets consisted mainly on Portuguese players playing in Portugal, yet to prove their true worth, as well as, for the most part, little known foreigners. It most certainly worked and such was Mourinho's impressive work in FC Porto that he managed to lead the club to two glorious seasons in 2003 and 2004, wrapping up consecutive Portuguese titles and a UEFA Cup and Champions League in succession. During this period Pinto da Costa remained somewhat in Mourinho's shadow and allowed him a very firm grip on all matters regarding football.

Post-Mourinho era
Victory in the Champions League final in 2004 meant that Mourinho left Porto, looking for another challenge in a bigger league. He was replaced by Luigi Del Neri, who only lasted 4 weeks on the job. In came Victor Fernandez, who qualified the club for the Champions League last 16 and won the Intercontinental Cup. He was sacked in late January 2005 following a home defeat to Sporting Braga which saw the club lose the championship lead. José Couceiro took over and led the club to a final standing of second in the league. He subsequently resigned his post.

In late May 2005, Co Adriaanse, former coach of Willem II, Ajax Amsterdam and AZ Alkmaar, was designated as the new FC Porto coach.

Under his guidance, FC Porto became an attacking team and the results were mixed, solid performances mixed with severe defensive flaws. European results in particular were terrible and Porto suffered a humiliating exit from the UEFA Champions League in the groups stage.

However, Co Adriaanse still guided Porto to a domestic double, wrapping up the title with 2 games to spare and beating Vitória de Setúbal for the Cup final.

Adriaanse resigned in the pre-season to the 2006–07 season, due to internal disputes with the club's board, and was subsequently replaced by former Benfica and Braga manager Jesualdo Ferreira, who had only just joined arch-rivals Boavista that season, and left without managing a single competitive match for Boavista. With him Porto won the league three consecutive times in 2006–07, 2007–08, and 2008–09.

In the 2010–11 season, with André Villas-Boas, Porto won the Portuguese SuperCup, the Portuguese title, the UEFA Europa League and the Portuguese Cup.

From 2013 to 2017, he failed to conquer any silverware, contributing to the biggest hiatus during his presidency.

Apito Dourado affair

Pinto da Costa was one of the people investigated by the police as part of the Apito Dourado (Golden Whistle) sports corruption scandal in Portuguese football. The investigation caused him to flee to Spain with his then partner Carolina Salgado in order to avoid detention in 2004. He was formally accused of corruption on 12 June 2007, along with Reinaldo Teles, another member of FC Porto's administration.

Following the inquiry, Pinto da Costa vowed to appeal the two-year ban placed on him by the LPFP's Discipline Committee in order to clear both his and the club's names. In a short interview, he stated: "We will not appeal the points deductions and we will still have a 14 or 15-point lead. But FC Porto's honour will be salvaged because I, personally, as president and a citizen, will appeal on Monday to the Justice Council. After this appeal, we will wait to see the truth come out and it will allow us to show there is no reason for FC Porto to have been penalised."

In early April 2009, Pinto da Costa was declared innocent in all allegations relating to bribery or any case dealing with Apito Dourado.

Later, on 21 January 2010, the Portuguese newspaper Correio da Manhã revealed that many of the wiretapped phone calls in the Apito Dourado scandal were made public on YouTube.

In May 2011, the decision made by the LPFP's Discipline Committee that initially punished FC Porto (6 points were taken) and Pinto da Costa (suspended for two years) was declared void and was thus annulled by the Administrative Court of Lisbon. FC Porto recovered those points in July 2017.

Football honours

Domestic 
 Primeira Liga: 23
 1984–85, 1985–86, 1987–88, 1989–90, 1991–92, 1992–93, 1994–95, 1995–96, 1996–97, 1997–98, 1998–99, 2002–03, 2003–04, 2005–06, 2006–07, 2007–08, 2008–09, 2010–11, 2011–12, 2012–13, 2017–18, 2019–20, 2021–22

 Taça de Portugal: 14
 1983–84, 1987–88, 1990–91, 1993–94, 1997–98, 1999–2000, 2000–01, 2002–03, 2005–06, 2008–09, 2009–10, 2010–11, 2019–20, 2021–22 

 Taça da Liga: 1
 2022–23

 Supertaça Cândido de Oliveira: 22
 1983, 1984, 1986, 1990, 1991, 1993, 1994, 1996, 1998, 1999, 2001, 2003, 2004, 2006, 2009, 2010, 2011, 2012, 2013, 2018, 2020, 2022

International 
 Intercontinental Cup: 2
 1987, 2004

 European Cup/UEFA Champions League: 2
1986–87, 2003–04

 UEFA Cup/UEFA Europa League: 2
2002–03, 2010–11

 European Super Cup: 1
 1987

In December 2011 he won the "Director's Career" and "Director of the Year" awards at the Globe Soccer Awards hosted in Dubai.

References

See also
 Carolina Salgado

1937 births
Living people
Sportspeople from Porto
Portuguese football chairmen and investors
FC Porto